was a   after Kyōhō and before Kanpō. This period spanned the years from April 1736 through February 1741.

Change of era
 1736 : To mark the enthronement of Sakuramachi, the era was changed to Genbun (meaning "Original civility"). The previous era ended and the new one commenced in Kyōhō 21, on the 21st day of the 4th month.

Events of the Genbun era
 1736 (Genbun 1): The shogunate published an edict declaring that henceforth, the sole, authorized coinage in the empire would be those copper coins which were marked on the obverse with the character 文 (pronounced bun in Japanese or pronounced wen in Chinese—which is to say, the same character which is found in this era name of Genbun).
 1737 (Genbun 2, 11th month): A comet is noticed in the western part of the sky.
 1738 (Genbun 3): Esoteric Shinto rituals  were performed by the emperor.
 1739 (Genbun 4):  Some foundrymen in Edo are commanded to create iron coins for use across the empire.
 1739 (Genbun 4): Hosokawa Etchū-no-kami of Higo was killed in Edo castle by Itakura Katsukane, and the killer was ordered to commit suicide as just punishment; however, Shōgun Yoshimune personally intervened to mitigate the adverse consequences for the killer's fudai family.
 August 8, 1740 (Genbun 5, 16th day of the 7th month): Great floods in Heian-kyō. Sanjo Bridge is washed away.
 January 11, 1741 (Genbun 5, 24th day of the 11th month): The esoteric Niiname-matsuri ceremonies were performed. This specific ceremony had otherwise been held in abeyance for the previous 280 years.

Notes

References
 Nussbaum, Louis Frédéric and Käthe Roth. (2005). Japan Encyclopedia. Cambridge: Harvard University Press. ; OCLC 48943301
 Ponsonby-Fane, Richard A.B. (1956). Kyoto: the Old Capital, 794-1869. Kyoto: Ponsonby-Fane Memorial.  OCLC 36644
 Screech, Timon. (2006). Secret Memoirs of the Shoguns: Isaac Titsingh and Japan, 1779-1822. London: RoutledgeCurzon. ; OCLC 65177072
 Titsingh, Isaac. (1834). Nihon Odai Ichiran; ou,  Annales des empereurs du Japon.  Paris: Royal Asiatic Society, Oriental Translation Fund of Great Britain and Ireland. OCLC 5850691.

External links 
 National Diet Library, "The Japanese Calendar" -- historical overview plus illustrative images from library's collection

Japanese eras
1730s in Japan
1740s in Japan